Marrack is a surname. Notable people with the surname include:

Marrack Goulding KCMG (1936–2010), British diplomat who served more than eleven years as Under-Secretary-General of the United Nations
Abi Marrack of Echo Beach (TV series), British teen drama series that aired on ITV in 2008
Hugh Marrack, CBE, DSC (1888–1972), submarine specialist in the Royal Navy, Commodore Superintendent, Gibraltar, 1943–45
John Marrack, DSO, MC (1886–1976), the Emeritus Professor of Chemical Pathology in the University of London
Philippa Marrack FRS is an English biologist, based in the United States

See also
Marac
Marak (disambiguation)